João Batista Viana Santos (born 20 July 1961 in Uberlândia, Brazil), or simply João Batista or Batista, is a Brazilian former footballer who played as a  defender. He won the silver medal at the 1988 Summer Olympics with Brazil. He played mainly for brazilian side Atlético–MG and portuguese side Tirsense where he earned 157 caps and 11 goals and won the 1993–94 Portuguese second division.

Honours
 II Liga Portuguesa: 1993-94

References

External links
 
 
 
 

1961 births
Living people
Brazilian footballers
Brazil international footballers
Olympic footballers of Brazil
Olympic silver medalists for Brazil
Footballers at the 1988 Summer Olympics
Brazilian expatriate footballers
Campeonato Brasileiro Série A players
Serie A players
Olympic medalists in football
Medalists at the 1988 Summer Olympics
Association football defenders
Clube Atlético Mineiro players
Club Athletico Paranaense players
F.C. Tirsense players